Princess Christina of the Netherlands (Maria Christina; 18 February 1947 – 16 August 2019) was the youngest of four daughters of Queen Juliana of the Netherlands and Prince Bernhard of Lippe-Biesterfeld.

Early life
Princess Christina, who was known as Princess Marijke in her youth, was born on 18 February 1947, at Soestdijk Palace, Baarn, the Netherlands. Her parents were Crown Princess Juliana, the only child of Queen Wilhelmina of the Netherlands, and Prince Bernhard of Lippe-Biesterfeld. At the time of her birth, she was fifth in the line to the throne after her mother and three older sisters: Princess Beatrix, Princess Irene and Princess Margriet.

She was baptised on 9 October 1947 and her godparents included Queen Wilhelmina (her maternal grandmother), her eldest sister Princess Beatrix, Sir Winston Churchill (for whom her father stood proxy), her paternal grandmother Armgard von Cramm, Prince Felix of Luxembourg, and his niece Princess Anne of Bourbon-Parma.

On 4 September 1948, after a reign of nearly 58 years, Christina's grandmother Queen Wilhelmina (68) abdicated the throne and her mother was inaugurated as Queen of the Kingdom of the Netherlands on 6 September 1948.

Childhood and education 

While her mother was pregnant with Christina, she contracted the German Measles or rubella and as a result, Christina was born nearly blind. With medical treatment and custom eyeglasses, her vision improved to a point that she could attend school and live a relatively normal life.

In 1963, she stopped using her first name Maria, from then on referring to herself merely as Christina. She graduated from secondary school (Amersfoort Lyceum) in 1965 and went on to  attend the University of Groningen where she studied teaching theory. At age 21 she moved to Canada to study classical music in at the École de musique Vincent-d’Indy in Montreal where she studied vocal teaching.

Marriage

While living in New York as Christina van Oranje, the Princess started a relationship with Cuban exile Jorge Guillermo.

Although societal attitudes were changing, because Guillermo was a Roman Catholic, it was still possible that a marriage could cause a public scandal in the Netherlands such as the one that occurred in 1964 when Christina's sister Princess Irene married the Catholic Prince Carlos Hugo of Bourbon-Parma. Accordingly, Princess Christina, at that time ninth in line for the Dutch throne, renounced her and her descendants' rights to the throne before officially announcing her engagement on St. Valentine's Day, 1975. She converted to Catholicism in 1992.

The couple were married on 28 June 1975, civilly in Baarn and then religiously in an ecumenical ceremony in the Cathedral of Saint Martin, Utrecht. After their wedding, they lived in New York but later moved to the Netherlands, where they built  in Wassenaar, near The Hague. The couple built up an extensive art collection. They had three children: 
Bernardo Federico Thomas Guillermo (born 17 June 1977, Utrecht), married 2 March 2009, New York City (USA), Eva Marie Prinz Valdes (born 2 August 1979) and has two children.
Nicolás Daniel Mauricio Guillermo (born 6 July 1979, Utrecht),
Juliana Edenia Antonia Guillermo (born 8 October 1981, Utrecht), has three children with Tao Bodhi.

By her request, the couple divorced on 25 April 1996.

Career

She began teaching singing in New York after completing her vocal teaching studies at the École de musique Vincent-d’Indy in Montreal. She recorded and released several CDs (classical, Broadway) in 2000 and 2002, and was a long-term supporter of the Youth Music Foundation in the Netherlands. In 1989, she allowed her name to be used for the Prinses Christina Concours an annual competition held in the Netherlands to encourage the musical talents of children in the Netherlands.

She performed at the marriage of her nephew Prince Bernhard Jr. and this was one of her few public performances. She also sang at the funerals of her both her parents Princess Juliana and Prince Bernhard in the New Church (Delft).

She completed a dance therapist training and worked, in the later part of her career, with sound and dance therapy. She worked to share her knowledge in the fields of dance/sound therapy and physical contact, with the blind. She worked for the Visio foundation in the towns of Huizen and Breda to achieve this.

Early 2019, Christina made headlines when she decided to sell several works of art. These works came to her through inheritance from the Dutch royal family: art lover William II of the Netherlands. Dutch institutions including the Museum Boymans Van Beuningen did not have enough funds to purchase the major piece of the auction, an anatomical drawing by Peter Paul Rubens. It was sold by Sotheby's for $8.2 million.

Death
In June 2018, it was announced that Princess Christina had been diagnosed with bone cancer. She died on 16 August 2019, aged 72. Her body was taken to Fagel's Garden Pavilion nearby Noordeinde Palace for a private service held on 22 August, and her remains were cremated.

Titles, styles and honours

Honours

National honours
 : Knight Grand Cross of the Order of the Netherlands Lion
 : Recipient of the Silver Wedding Anniversary Medal of Queen Juliana and Prince Bernhard 1962
 : Recipient of the Wedding Medal of Princess Beatrix, Princess of Orange and Claus von Amsberg 1966
 : Recipient of the Queen Beatrix Inauguration Medal 1980
 : Recipient of the Wedding Medal of Prince Willem-Alexander, Prince of Orange and Máxima Zorreguieta 2002
 : Recipient of the King Willem-Alexander Inauguration Medal 2013

Foreign honours
  Grand Duchy: Knight Grand Cross of the Order of the Oak Crown
  Nepalese Royal Family: Member Grand Cross of the Royal Order of the Three Divine Powers

Ancestry

References

External links
 
 Royal House of the Netherlands
 

1947 births
2019 deaths
House of Orange-Nassau
Dutch people of German descent
Dutch people of Russian descent
Dutch women singers
Dutch Roman Catholics
Dutch music educators
Dutch expatriates in the United States
Dutch expatriates in England
Dutch expatriates in Italy
Converts to Roman Catholicism from Calvinism
Princesses of Orange-Nassau
University of Groningen alumni
National Theatre School of Canada alumni
People from Baarn
Montessori teachers
House of Lippe
Blind musicians
Blind educators
Blind royalty and nobility
Dutch blind people
Deaths from bone cancer
Deaths from cancer in the Netherlands
Daughters of monarchs